Mimic 2 is a 2001 science fiction horror film, directed by Jean de Segonzac, with a script inspired by a short story of the same name by Donald A. Wollheim. The movie was a direct-to-DVD sequel to Mimic (1997), and was followed by Mimic 3: Sentinel (2003).

The thriller stars long-time film veteran Edward Albert, along with Alix Koromzay, Bruno Campos and Jon Polito.

Plot
Four years after the events of the first film, after three men are discovered hideously mutilated (their faces have been removed) and strung up among New York City's high-tension wires, Detective Klaski (Bruno Campos) stumbles upon a link: Each of the men knew entomologist Remy (Alix Koromzay), a teacher at an inner-city high school. Klaski considers Remy to be a prime, albeit unlikely, suspect in the killings until he witnesses for himself the shape-shifting creature that has been stalking Remy: an intelligent mutant insect with the face of its previous victim that wants to mate with Remy.

Klaski, Remy and a pair of her students get trapped inside the school as the creature hunts them down. Remy gets separated and runs into the creature which does not harm her but instead seems interested in her. Remy then gets cornered and the creature attempts to give her pizza. Meanwhile, a special forces unit, headed by the militant leader known only as Darksuit (Edward Albert), gets ready to fumigate the school with poisonous gas. After all the trapped humans seem to have escaped the fumigation, and with the help of a heroic Klaski in Remy's case, inspection teams following through find the creature's recently vacated husk and, later on, the mangled corpse of Klaski.

It appears that the creature, impersonating Klaski, has been caring for Remy's well-being with a mind to fulfill its base purpose. Unfortunately for it, when they finally meet in a suspenseful setting in Remy's apartment, she decapitates it. However, it is not dead as cockroaches can live up to two weeks without a head and Remy and one of the students, who is now living with her, are left wondering how to handle the situation.

Cast

 Alix Koromzay as Remy Panos
 Edward Albert as Darksuit
 Bruno Campos as Detective Klaski
 Will Estes as Nicky
 Gaven E. Lucas as Sal Aguirre
 Jon Polito as Morrie Deaver
 Jody Wood as Detective Clecknal
 Jim O'Heir as Lou
 Brian Leckner as Jason Mundy
 Paul Schulze as Phillip

Reception

Critical response
The film received negative reviews. Christabel Padmore from Apollo Movie Guide said: "The only reason you might watch Mimic 2 is if you're a fan of some of the special effects used in the first movie". Keith Brown from Eye for Film judged: "There's nothing particularly wrong with Mimic 2, as B-movie monster movies go". Nathan Rabin for The Onion wrote: "Mimic 2 is the very definition of an arbitrary sequel: it essentially remakes its little-loved predecessor, which combined Cronenbergian weird science, Alien-style claustrophobia, and abundant gore to little discernible effect". eFilmCritic reviewer Jack Sommersby called "incompetent and unimaginative on just about every level". The Horror Review felt: "Though it doesn’t set any genre or cinematic precedence, it does take the time to develop character relationships, create atmosphere, and establish dread within its viewer, resulting in an enjoyable second outing that, in many respects, trumps its forerunner". The publication gave it 4 out of 5 stars. The film holds 8% positive critics on Rotten Tomatoes.

Accolades
 Won: Video Premiere Award – Best Visual Effects
 Nominated: Video Premiere Award – Best Cinematography
 Nominated: Video Premiere Award – Best Editing

Sequel

Mimic 3: Sentinel was released in 2003. Directed by J.T. Petty, its script was also inspired by the short story "Mimic" by Donald A. Wollheim. While a direct-to-DVD sequel to both Mimic and Mimic 2, it takes a different thematic approach.

References

External links
 
 
 

2001 films
2001 direct-to-video films
2001 horror films
2000s monster movies
2000s science fiction horror films
American monster movies
American natural horror films
American science fiction horror films
Direct-to-video horror films
Direct-to-video sequel films
Films about insects
Films set in New York City
Films directed by Jean de Segonzac
Films with screenplays by Joel Soisson
Dimension Films films
2001 directorial debut films
2000s English-language films
2000s American films